The 1897 European Rowing Championships were rowing championships held on Lake Maggiore in the Italian commune of Pallanza on 8 September. The competition was for men only, four nations competed (Belgium, France, Italy, and Switzerland), and the regatta had four boat classes (M1x, M2+, M4+, M8+). At the FISA Congress held on the same day as these championships, it was decided that the double scull boat class would be introduced in the following year.

Event schedule
Four races took place on 8 September 1897. As only four nations competed, no heats had to be rowed. The regatta used a 2000 m course:

3pm: French Cup (Coxed four)
4pm: Belgian Cup (Single scull)
5pm: Adriatic Cup (Coxed pair)
6pm: Italian Cup (Eight)

Medal summary

Footnotes

References

European Rowing Championships
European Rowing Championships
Rowing
Rowing
European Rowing Championships
Rowing competitions in Italy
Sport in Verbania